The Maltese Political Union was a political party in Malta.

History
The party was established in 1920 by a merger of the Malta Political Association and the Patriotic Committee. It emerged as the largest party in Parliament as a result of the 1921 elections, and its leader Joseph Howard became the country's first Prime Minister. Two of the most popular politicians within the party were Enrico Dandria and Ignazio Panzavecchia, both clerics representing the party in Parliament.

The 1924 elections saw the party reduced to 10 seats, and it had to form a coalition with the Democratic Nationalist Party to stay in power. In 1926 the two parties merged to form the Nationalist Party.

In 1947 the Democratic Action Party was established as a revived Maltese Political Union.

Ideology
The party sought to give the Italian language equal status with English in education and to progress towards self-government. It also defended the powers of the Catholic church.

Election results

References

Defunct political parties in Malta
Political parties established in 1920
Political parties disestablished in 1926
1920 establishments in Malta
1926 disestablishments in Malta
Catholic political parties